Snyder Peninsula is a high, ice-covered peninsula on the south side of Lamplugh Inlet terminating in Cape Howard, on the east coast of Palmer Land. Mapped by the United States Geological Survey (USGS) in 1974. Named by Advisory Committee on Antarctic Names (US-ACAN) for R. Admiral Joseph E. Snyder, Jr., U.S. Navy, Antarctic project Officer for the Assistant Secretary of the Navy for Research and Development, 1967–69.

References

Peninsulas of Palmer Land